Isabelle Kocher (born 9 December 1966) is a French businesswoman. She was the chief executive officer of Engie (previously GDF Suez) until February 24 2020.

Early life and education
Isabelle Kocher graduated from the École normale supérieure in Paris in 1987 and Mines ParisTech engineering school. She also holds a master's degree in quantum optics and a postgraduate certificate in physics.

Career

Career in the public sector
From 1997 to 1999, Kocher was director of the postal and telecommunication budgets, followed by the defense budget at the French Budget Department. Between 1999 and 2002, she worked as industrial affairs advisor at the office of French prime minister Lionel Jospin.

Career in the private sector
She joined the Suez company in 2002 and held functional and operational positions. She was running its French water operations when it became GDF Suez in 2008. Kocher was then elevated to finance director and operations director.

She was appointed in 2011 as chief financial officer of GDF Suez. Between October 2014 and April 2016, she served as deputy CEO and chief operating officer.

CEO of Engie, 2016–2020
On 3 May 2016 Kocher was appointed CEO of Engie, replacing Gérard Mestrallet. She became the only woman CEO in the CAC 40 index.

Since assuming her position as CEO, Kocher has clarified and redefined Engie's strategy, and undertook major transformations to position Engie as "a forerunner" and "a major player" on the energy market for the decades to come.
Kocher stated that as a world leading energy player, Engie had to "take its responsibility" against climate change and consider it not as a threat, but as a lever for radical change. She believes the sector must face a revolution in order to meet the challenge and move towards a world that is decarbonised, partly decentralised and digitalised  and where energy is available to all, including developing countries.

To align the company with her vision, Kocher undertook the following initiatives:

 restructuring the group and reducing layers of management to make Engie more agile, and its staff more autonomous. To ensure this goal, Engie also invested €300 million into a transformation plan to improve employee training.
 selling 20% of the company's assets worth 15 billion euros, especially in coal power; and reinvesting the proceeds into renewable energy, such as wind and solar, and expanding into decentralised power, including localised renewable power plants.
 by planning to invest €1.5 billion in digital and various innovative technologies by the end of 2018.
Open-innovation and digital technologies are vital to Engie's transition, as digitization must enable the management of local renewable energy stocks through intelligent networks.

To further encourage the focus of diversification at Engie, Kocher made a priority of increasing the diversity of its personnel teams. She is making Engie more international in its makeup, and set a target of ensuring at least a quarter of Engie executives were women and 35% of high-potential staff were female.

Kocher campaigned in 2018 to take on the chairman’s role when Mestrallet retired, but lost out after the government supported Jean-Pierre Clamadieu instead. 

In 2019, after having invested €15 billion in new activities, Kocher announced the definitive exit of coal activities and a new strategic plan for the years 2019-2021. Her plan is to specialize in high value-added services and in renewable energies. She planned to invest another €12 billion in these activities, partly financed by the sale of €6 billion assets (including the last coal plants). She also announced her intention to leave 20 of the 70 countries where Engie is active, and focus the group's activities on 20 countries and 30 metropolitan areas, mainly in Southeast Asia and Africa.

By the end of 2019, Kocher came under pressure amid reports of a strategy split within the group and disagreements between board members on whether to pursue a sell-off of some gas assets. She subsequently failed to get state backing to serve another term. 

On 6 February 2020 it was announced that her mandate as CEO would not be renewed and that new leadership was needed at the head of Engie.

Other positions
She is member of the board of Suez, Axa and International Power. She is chairman of Terrawatt Initiative, a global non profit-organization designed to implement a new global energy mix along 3 axes:

 deploying modern technologies to replace the old power grids, incapable of handling a significant increase in renewable energy
 providing for the world’s needs in energy in developing countries, by deploying new renewable assets
 withdrawing from fossil energy in developed countries, by replacing old assets with clean and renewable energy.

Terrawatt's goal is to present ready-to-implement propositions at COP 23.

Recognition 
Kocher is a knight of the Legion of Honor and a knight of the French National Order of Merit.

In September 2017, she was ranked third in Fortune's international list of most powerful women.

Personal life 
Kocher has five children.

References

1966 births
Living people
Lycée Janson-de-Sailly alumni
École Normale Supérieure alumni
Mines Paris - PSL alumni
Corps des mines
Engie
French women chief executives
French chief executives
People from Neuilly-sur-Seine
Chevaliers of the Légion d'honneur
Officers of the Ordre national du Mérite
French energy industry businesspeople